The Princeville Titans are a Canadian Junior ice hockey team from Princeville, Quebec, Canada.  They are a part of the Quebec Junior Hockey League.

History

The team originated as the Warwick Titans in 1996.  They became the College Lafleche Titans in 2002.

The 2005-06 season was their first campaign to finish with a winning record.  They were good enough to lose the league final in six games to the eventual Fred Page Cup Eastern Canadian Champion Joliette Action.

In Summer 2008, the Titans were relocated to Princeville, Quebec.

The Titans won their first Quebec Junior League Championship during the 2011-12 season and the league representative at the Eastern Canadian Jr. A Fred Page Cup Championships. The team went 0-3 in the round robin play.

Season-by-season record
Note: GP = Games Played, W = Wins, L = Losses, T = Ties, OTL = Overtime Losses, GF = Goals for, GA = Goals against

Fred Page Cup 
Eastern Canada Championships
MHL - QAAAJHL - CCHL - Host
Round robin play with 2nd vs 3rd in semi-final to advance against 1st in the finals.

External links
Titans Webpage

Ligue de Hockey Junior AAA Quebec teams